During the 1994–95 Dutch football season, PSV Eindhoven competed in the Eredivisie.

Squad
Squad at end of season

Left club during season

Transfers

In
  Ernest Faber –  FC Groningen (loan return)
  René Klomp –  Sparta (loan return)
  Geoffrey Prommayon –  FC Eindhoven (loan return)
  Stanley Menzo –  Ajax
  Ronald Waterreus –  Roda JC
  Luc Nilis –  Anderlecht
  Boudewijn Pahlplatz –  FC Twente
  Ronaldo –  Cruzeiro
  Vampeta –  Vitória
  Marciano Vink –  Genoa
  Stan Valckx –  Sporting CP, October 1994

Out
  Nii Lamptey –  Anderlecht (loan return)
  Hans van Breukelen – retired
  Berry van Aerle –  Helmond Sport
  Adri van Tiggelen –  Dordrecht'90
  Kalusha Bwalya –  Club América
  Jerry de Jong –  Caen
  Erwin Koeman –  FC Groningen
  Wim de Ron –  Cambuur Leeuwarden
  Juul Ellerman –  FC Twente
  Jan Heintze –  Bayer Uerdingen
  Klas Ingesson –  Sheffield Wednesday
  Thomas Thorninger –  AGF
  Edwin van Ankeren –  Eendracht Aalst
  Gheorghe Popescu –  Tottenham Hotspur, September 1994
  Mitchell van der Gaag –  Motherwell, January 1995
  Vampeta –  VVV (loan), February 1995

Competitions

Eredivisie

League table

Matches

KNVB beker

Round of 32

Eightfinals

UEFA Cup

First round

Statistics

Players statistics

References

PSV Eindhoven seasons
Psv Eindhoven